Joseph Bouillon (3 May 1908 – 9 July 1984) was a French composer, conductor and violinist. As Joséphine Baker's fourth husband, he enjoyed prominence in the 1950s.

Biography
Bouillon's father and his brother Gabriel were musicologists, respectively in Montpellier and Paris. From 1936 to 1947, he directed the "Jo Bouillon et son orchestre" ensemble then devoted himself to accompanying Joséphine Baker.

Baker made many recordings with Jo Bouillon who accompanied her on her tours, as he accompanied Mistinguett and Maurice Chevalier. Bouillon married Baker in 1947 and together they bought the Château des Milandes in Dordogne. There they carried out their project to adopt children of different nationalities, in order to prove that the cohabitation of different "races" could work admirably. Finally, they adopted twelve children. All the children that the couple adopted bear the name "Bouillon".

Baker and Bouillon separated in 1957 and divorced in 1961. Bouillon retired to Buenos Aires where he opened a French restaurant, Le Bistro. He died in 1984, at the age of 76, and is buried in the Monaco Cemetery, his coffin resting on top of Baker's in the black granite vault of Africa offered by Princess Grace.

References

Bibliography
 Joséphine, with Joséphine Baker (and the collaboration of ), Éditions Robert Laffont, 1976
 La véritable Joséphine Baker,  by Emmanuel Bonini, éditions Pygmalion, 2000

External links
 Jo Bouillon et son orchestre (YouTube)

1908 births
1984 deaths
Musicians from Montpellier
French male conductors (music)
20th-century French composers
Burials in Monaco
20th-century French conductors (music)
20th-century French male musicians